Cheiloxena is a genus of leaf beetles in the subfamily Spilopyrinae. It is endemic to Australia, occurring from southern Victoria to central Queensland.

Species
 Cheiloxena aitori Reid & Beatson, 2018
 Cheiloxena blackburni Reid, 1992
 Cheiloxena conani Reid & Beatson, 2018
 Cheiloxena frenchae Blackburn, 1893
 Cheiloxena insignis Blackburn, 1896
 Cheiloxena monga Reid & Beatson, 2018
 Cheiloxena tuberosa Reid, 1992
 Cheiloxena westwoodii Baly, 1860

References

External links
 Australian Faunal Directory – Genus Cheiloxena Baly, 1860

Chrysomelidae genera
Beetles of Australia
Taxa named by Joseph Sugar Baly